Rutavand or Rutvand or Rutevand or Rootvand may refer to:
 Rutavand, Eslamabad-e Gharb
 Rutvand-e Ardeshir (disambiguation), villages in Gilan-e Gharb County
 Rutavand, Ravansar